Lilantia is a former municipality in Euboea, Greece. Since the 2011 local government reform it is part of the municipality Chalcis, of which it is a municipal unit. The municipal unit has an area of 111.446 km2. Population 16,994 (2011). The seat of the municipality was in Vasiliko.

References

External links
Official website (in Greek)

Populated places in Euboea